Gerald Denys Marchand (24 April 1921 – 26 March 2005) was a British sprint canoer who competed in the early 1950s. At the 1952 Summer Olympics in Helsinki, he finished ninth in the C-1 10000 m event while being eliminated in the heats of the C-1 1000 m event.

References

Gerald Marchand's obituary

1921 births
2005 deaths
Canoeists at the 1952 Summer Olympics
Olympic canoeists of Great Britain
British male canoeists